Dorcadion obtusum is a species of beetle in the family Cerambycidae. It was described by Breuning in 1944.

References

obtusum
Beetles described in 1944